Peter Norman Bulmer Howell (25 October 1919 – 20 April 2015) was an English actor.

Born in London, he was educated at Winchester College and began studying law at Christ Church, Oxford, but left in 1939 after being called up for military service in World War II. He served as a second-lieutenant in the Rifle Brigade, but was invalided out with dysentery during the North Africa Campaign in 1943. Shortly after, he made his professional stage debut with the Old Vic company. His West End plays included The Affair, The Doctor's Dilemma, Little Boxes, and Conduct Unbecoming.

Howell's most recognised role was as Dr. Peter Harrison in television hospital drama series Emergency – Ward 10 from 1958 to 1964, making brief returns to the series in 1966 and for the show's final episode in 1967. He made guest appearances in The Avengers, The Prisoner, Bill Brand, the Doctor Who serial The Mutants and Yes Minister. He played the prison governor in the 1979 film Scum.

On BBC Radio 4, Howell played Ducem Barr in the episode The General from The Foundation Trilogy during 1973, Saruman in the 1981 adaptation of The Lord of the Rings and had a recurring role as the Right Reverend Cyril Hood, Bishop of Felpersham, in the long-running drama The Archers from 1987 to 2006. He also played the role of Sir William Lucas in the 1980 BBC adaptation of Jane Austen's novel Pride & Prejudice, a miniseries also featuring Elizabeth Garvie and David Rintoul.

Howell married Susan Cheshire in 1957, and they remained together until her death in 1992. They had three daughters, Polly, Tamara and Camilla, and a son, Benji. He was a close friend of fellow actor Sir Ian McKellen, who was godfather to his daughter Tamara.

Howell was an active member of the Labour Party who campaigned for a number of social issues. He was also a longtime member of the Marylebone Cricket Club, and opposed their planned 1968–69 England cricket tour of apartheid-era South Africa, which was eventually cancelled. He helped to raise funds for the building of Watermans Arts Centre near his home in Chiswick, west London.

Howell died at Denville Hall, a home for retired actors in Northwood, London, on 20 April 2015 after a short illness, aged 95.

Filmography

References

External links
 
 Howell Obituary at The Guardian

1919 births
2015 deaths
English male stage actors
English male film actors
English male radio actors
English male television actors
Male actors from London
People educated at Winchester College
Alumni of Christ Church, Oxford
British Army personnel of World War II
Rifle Brigade officers
Labour Party (UK) people
Marylebone Cricket Club cricketers
20th-century English male actors
21st-century English male actors
Military personnel from London